Mario Haas (born 16 September 1974) is an Austrian former professional footballer who played as a forward. Apart from two short foreign engagements in France and Japan, he played most of his career with SK Sturm Graz. Haas also made 43 appearances for the Austria national football team, including at the 1998 World Cup in France.

Career

Club career 

Mario Haas was active in SK Sturm Graz's youth section for ten years before playing his first game for the club's professionals in the spring of 1993. In the following years he played a major role in the two league titles in 1998 and 1999 and the three Austrian Cup victories in 1996, 1997 and 1999. Together with Ivica Vastić and Hannes Reinmayr he formed the so-called "magic triangle" of Sturm Graz during this successful period. In the summer of 1999, he decided to make his first move abroad, moving to France to join Racing Strasbourg. However, he was unable to establish himself there and therefore returned to his home club in the spring of 2001.

During the winter break of the 2004/05 season, his ex-coach Ivica Osim brought him to JEF United in the J1 League in Japan. He won the Japanese Cup with the club in both 2005 (the club's first ever trophy) and 2006. From the spring of 2007, Mario Haas played again for his regular club Sturm Graz, with whom he triumphed in the Austrian Cup for the fourth time in 2010. He was substituted in the match against Kapfenberger SV on February 12, 2011, marking his 412th appearance for SK Sturm Graz in the Bundesliga and making him the team's sole record holder ahead of Günther Neukirchner. At the end of the 2010/11 season, Haas became Austrian football champion with Sturm for the third time. Thus, Mario Haas was involved in all three league titles and four of five cup victories of Sturm Graz.

On December 1, 2012, Mario Haas ended his active career at the age of 38 during the match Sturm Graz vs. Wiener Neustadt (3:1). Today he runs his own football camps. He was coach of FC Bad Radkersburg, after the termination of his contract he became coach of USV Mettersdorf, but this contract was terminated after 5 defeats in a row.

At the general assembly of SK Sturm Graz on January 18, 2016, he was honored as honorary captain together with Günther Neukirchner and Andy Pichler.

National team 
Haas made his debut for the Austria national team in an April 1998 friendly match against the United States and was a participant at the 1998 FIFA World Cup. He earned 43 caps, scoring seven goals. His last international was a May 2007 friendly match against Scotland. He was asked to play in Austria's squad in a friendly match against Turkey in November 2008, by Austria's coach Karel Brückner, but refused, saying that he wanted to concentrate on his job at Sturm Graz.

Career statistics

Club

International

Honours
Sturm Graz
Austrian Bundesliga: 1997–98, 1998–99, 2010–11
Austrian Cup: 1995–96, 1996–97, 1998–99, 2009–10
Austrian Supercup: 1996, 1997
Top scorer: 1995, 1998, 1999, 2004, 2005, 2008, 2009
Record player with 451 appearances

JEF United Chiba
J.League Cup: 2005, 2006

References

External links

1974 births
Living people
Footballers from Graz
Austrian footballers
Association football forwards
Austria international footballers
1998 FIFA World Cup players
SK Sturm Graz players
RC Strasbourg Alsace players
JEF United Chiba players
Austrian Football Bundesliga players
Ligue 1 players
J1 League players
Austrian expatriate footballers
Austrian expatriate sportspeople in France
Austrian expatriate sportspeople in Japan
Expatriate footballers in France
Expatriate footballers in Japan